Arreola is a surname. Notable people with the surname include:

Chris Arreola, American Heavyweight boxer
Daniel Arreola, Mexican football (soccer) player
Éder Arreola, American football (soccer) player
Jairo Arreola, Guatemalan football (soccer) player
Juan José Arreola, Mexican writer, academic, and actor